Hualien Business Bank was bank in the Republic of China on Taiwan. A small bank with 31 branches it ran into difficult financial times, and the government seized control in January 2007. In June its assets were auctioned off to Chinatrust Financial Holding.

See also
List of banks in Taiwan
Republic of China 
Economy of Taiwan
List of companies of Taiwan

References

2007 disestablishments in Taiwan
Banks of Taiwan
Banks with year of establishment missing